Romuald Jałbrzykowski (7 February 1876 – 19 June 1955) was a Polish Catholic priest. From 1925 to 1926 he was the bishop of Łomża; from 1926 to 1955, archbishop of Wilno (Vilnius) and from 1945 to 1955, bishop of Białystok.

While Jałbrzykowski was the Archbishop of Vilnius, Saint Faustina Kowalska was a nun at the convent there, and her confessor was Father Michael Sopocko. Jałbrzykowski gave Sopocko permission to display the Divine Mercy image for the first time ever during a Mass on April 28, 1935, the second Sunday of Easter; the feast that is now officially called Divine Mercy Sunday.

Jałbrzykowski knew Faustina, and she had been to confession with him and told him about the Divine Mercy devotion. In January 1936, Faustina went to see him again to discuss a new congregation for Divine Mercy, but he reminded her that she was perpetually vowed to her current order. In the summer of 1936, Jalbrzykowski provided his imprimatur for the first brochure on the Divine Mercy devotion, written by Sopocko.

In 1939, a year after Faustina's death, Jałbrzykowski noticed that her predictions about the war had taken place and allowed public access to the Divine Mercy image. That resulted in large crowds and led to the spread of the Divine Mercy devotion.

From 1942 to 1944, he was imprisoned by Nazi Germany. In 1945 he was freed by the Red Army, only to be quickly deported to Poland, as the Soviets tried to destroy the archdiocese of Vilnius in the Lithuanian Soviet Socialist Republic. He died in 1955.

See also
Reorganization of occupied dioceses during World War II

References

1876 births
1955 deaths
Roman Catholic archbishops of Vilnius
Bishops of Białystok
Bishops of Łomża
20th-century Roman Catholic archbishops in Lithuania
People from Zambrów County